Ji.hlava International Documentary Film Festival, known as MFDF Ji.hlava or Ji.hlava IDFF, is a documentary film festival in Jihlava, Czech Republic, normally held in late October. The 25th edition of the festival will run from 26 to 31 October 2021.

The 2018 festival was attended by over 40,000 visitors from over 80 countries. More than 1,000 film professionals took part in the Ji.hlava Industry Programme, which includes projects such as Emerging Producers, Festival Identity, and Conference Fascinations. In 2020, the festival presented 325 films.

The festival was founded in 1997 by a group of Jihlava high school students led by Marek Hovorka, who has been the director of the festival since then. Since 2001, the festival has been organised by the Jihlava Association of Amateur Filmmakers, which in 2015 was renamed DOC.DREAM - the Association for the Support of Documentary Cinema. Ji.hlava IDFF is a co-founder of Doc Alliance, a coalition of seven large European documentary film festivals.

The festival's motto is "Thinking Through Film".

Programme

Competition sections 
The main festival consists of 7 competitions:
 Opus Bonum - Best World Documentary Film
 Between the Seas - Best Central and Eastern European Documentary Film
Between the Seas Student Film Competition - Best Central and Eastern European Student Documentary Film
 Czech Joy - Best Czech Documentary Film
 First Lights - Best Debut Documentary Film
 Fascinations - Best World Experimental Documentary Film
 Fascinations: Exprmntl.cz - Best Czech Experimental Documentary Film
 Short Joy - Best Short Documentary Film
 Thematic competition section: Testimony - on politics, on nature and on knowledge - is an international competition for best documentary with historical and political cross-over, on ecological and environmental topic or documentary that expands the non-fiction genre.
The festival annually nominates one film to be added to the pre-selection for the European Film Academy (EFA) award for Best Documentary Film of the Year. Also, the winners of the Short Joy award are eligible for the pre-selection for the Documentary Short Subject category of the Academy Awards.

Non-competition sections 
Alongside the competitions sections, the festival presents a number of non-competition sections covering different areas of documentary film. The regular non-competition sections are:
 Reality TV - a section focusing on new television formats and current cross-genre forms, such as docudrama, docusoap, reality show or mockumentary
 Czech Television Documentaries - an overview of the documentaries produced by Czech Television
 FAMU Presents - a presentation of work by students of the Film and TV School of the Academy of Performing Arts in Prague (FAMU)
 Translucent Beings - a section presenting works by key personalities in the history of documentary films
 Transparent Landscape - a cross-section of the documentaries of particular countries
 Constellations - a selection of notable world films from other film festivals
 Conference Fascinations - a long-term program that uses experimental films to introduce retrospective topics related to Central and Eastern Europe
 Siren Test - explore today's international music documentary and experimentation
 Doc Alliance Selection - Doc Alliance Selection Award is an award given by the independent Doc Alliance platform, associating 7 European documentary festivals: CPH:DOX , Millenium Docs Against Gravity FF, Doclisboa, DOK Leipzig, FIDMarseille, MFDF Ji.hlava a Visions du Réel

Accompanying programme 
Another feature of the festival is its accompanying programme, comprising thematic exhibitions, awards for the best festival poster, music and theatre performances, authors' readings, radio documentaries and documentary theatre plays or a special Laboratorium installation.

Other activities 
Ji.hlava IDFF organises various activities throughout the year. It works closely with six other European documentary film festivals through the Doc Alliance, whose Doc Alliance Films website, devoted to documentary and experimental movie online distribution, is an original project of the festival. It also participates in DOC.STREAM projects for film professionals, Eastern European documentary East Silver Market, and, in collaboration with the Czech Institute of Documentary Film, the Ex Oriente Film project.

DOC.DREAM, the organiser of the festival, is also a publisher (e.g. Bill Nichols: Introduction to Documentary; Guy Gauthier: Le Documentaire, un autre cinéma; Karel Vachek: The Theory of Matter; David Čeněk: Chris Marker) and runs the online dok.revue portal, dedicated to theory and criticism of documentary film.

Ji.hlava Industry Programme 
Ji.hlava Industry Programme encompasses activities focused on film professionals and has been a significant part of the festival for the past sixteen years. The section includes:
 Emerging Producers - an educational and networking project promoting European documentary film producers
 Docu Talents From the East - a panel showcasing creative documentary projects from Central and Eastern Europe in the production or post-production phase, held annually since 2004. It has been organized in cooperation with Sarajevo Film Festival since 2017.
 Festival Identity - a meeting and knowledge exchange of film festival organisers
 Inspiration Forum - a platform bringing together documentary film directors with personalities from outside the film community such as scientists, writers, artists, activists, and philosophers
 Conference Fascinations - a conference focusing on experimental film distribution
 Visegrad Accelerator - a platform for meeting of Czech, Hungarian, Polish, and Slovak film professionals, state institutions and media representatives

Year-round Activities 
Apart from the festival itself, which takes place in October, the Ji.hlava IDFF team organises various events at other times of the year:
 Echoes of Ji.hlava IDFF - festival echoes take place in the Czech Republic and other European countries
 Documentary Mondays - regular documentary film screenings with the film-makers present, taking place in the Prague art cinema Světozor
 Living Cinema - summer screenings of selected Czech documentary films, taking place in unconventional locations in Jihlava and Prague
 Czech Joy in Czech Cinemas - distribution of selected Czech documentary films in Czech and Slovak cinemas

Educational Activities 
Ji.hlava IDFF participates in a number of educational activities:
 Center for Documentary Film - a creative space in Jihlava Dukla cinema dedicated to the study of documentary cinematography
 Media & Documentary - a workshop for film science and journalism students focused on writing about documentary film, taking place during the Ji.hlava IDFF

References

External links 

 http://www.ji-hlava.com/ - official website
http://www.ji-hlava.com/tiskove-zpravy/vitezove-22-ji-hlavy-uzamceny-svet-i-volny-pokoj - 2018 press release
https://variety.com/2018/film/spotlight/ji-hlava-docu-festival-focuses-on-emerging-producers-1203006449/ - Emerging Producers 
http://www.dokrevue.com/ - festival blog

Documentary film festivals in the Czech Republic
Film festivals established in 1997
October events
1997 establishments in the Czech Republic